The Catholic University of Bukavu is a private university in Bukavu, Democratic Republic of the Congo. It is a member of the AUF.

History 
It was established in 1989.

References

External links 
 

Universities in the Democratic Republic of the Congo
Bukavu
Educational institutions established in 1989
1989 establishments in Zaire